Samoa competed at the 2004 Summer Paralympics in Athens. The country was represented by two athletes, both competing in track and field. Neither won a medal.

Athletics

See also
2004 Summer Paralympics
Samoa at the Paralympics
Samoa at the 2004 Summer Olympics

External links
International Paralympic Committee

References

Nations at the 2004 Summer Paralympics
2004
Paralympics